Zhang Li (born November 29, 1981 in Yingkou, Liaoning) is a female Chinese épée fencer.

Zhang won the gold medal in the épée team event at the 2006 World Fencing Championships after beating France in the final. She accomplished this with her team mates Li Na, Luo Xiaojuan and Zhong Weiping.  She also represented China at the 2004 Athens Olympics, finishing 6th in both the individual and team épée events.

Achievements
 2006 World Fencing Championships, team épée

References

1981 births
Living people
Fencers at the 2004 Summer Olympics
Olympic fencers of China
People from Yingkou
Fencers from Liaoning
Asian Games medalists in fencing
Fencers at the 2002 Asian Games
Fencers at the 2006 Asian Games
Chinese female fencers
Asian Games gold medalists for China
Asian Games silver medalists for China
Medalists at the 2002 Asian Games
Medalists at the 2006 Asian Games
Universiade medalists in fencing
Universiade silver medalists for China
Medalists at the 2003 Summer Universiade
21st-century Chinese women